Mallik Rashaun Coley Wilks (born 15 December 1998) is a British professional footballer who plays as a forward for Sheffield Wednesday. He can play as a winger or as a striker.

Career

Leeds United
Born in Leeds, England, Wilks grew up in Chapeltown and started his career at Leeds United, where he graduated through the academy. After an impressive display at Leeds United's U18 side, he signed scholarship in 2015.

Under head Coach Garry Monk, with Wilks in impressive form for Leeds' Under 23 and youth sides, Wilks was called up to the first team squad, and was named as an unused substitute on 13 December 2016 against Reading in EFL Championship. Wilks was given squad number 36 for the season. On 30 December 2016, days after his 18th birthday, Wilks signed his first professional contract at the club. Wilks was named on the bench and made his debut as a substitute for Leeds against Sutton United on 29 January 2017 in the FA Cup.

On 24 August 2017, Wilks signed a new four-year contract with Leeds United. Whilst out on loan to Doncaster Rovers, on 1 January 2019, Wilks signed a new 2-year contract extension at Leeds, and extended his loan at Doncaster.

Accrington Stanley loan
The same day he joined League Two side Accrington Stanley on loan, initially until 3 January 2018.

Wilks made his Accrington Stanley debut on 25 August, against Notts County and scored a 95th-minute equaliser on his debut in a 2–2 draw. He scored again a month later on 16 September 2017, in a 2–1 win over Chesterfield, followed up by scoring against Middlesbrough U21s. Wilks later scored two more goals against Newport County and Lincoln City. After scoring 5 goals in all competitions for Accrington in 23 games, in which he spent time on the substitute bench, Wilks returned to Leeds on 3 January upon the expiry of his loan spell. Despite leaving the club in January, he received a winners medal at the end of the 2017–18 season after Accrington went on to win the League Two title.

Grimsby Town loan
On 26 January 2018, Wilks joined League Two side Grimsby Town on loan until the end of the season. On 27 January 2018, Wilks made his debut for Grimsby in a 1–0 defeat against Luton Town. He went on to play in four games for the club before limping out of a 3–0 defeat against Crawley Town on 10 February. On 6 March 2018 he returned to Leeds United due to injury for treatment. He returned to Grimsby after treatment, and returned from injury on 24 March when he started in a 4–0 defeat against Coventry City.

Doncaster Rovers loan
On 11 July 2018, Wilks joined EFL League One side Doncaster Rovers on a 6-month loan until 2 January 2019. He started and scored on his debut for the club on 4 August, scoring in the 2–3 win against Southend United. Wilks scored in each of his first 3 games at the club and was also awarded 3 consecutive man of the match awards in these games. He scored his 4th goal of the season on 15 September in the 1–4 win against Walsall, also receiving his 4th man of the match award of the season.

The accolades continued when on 17 September, Wilks was named in the EFL Team Of The Week, and also as the Sky Bet League One 'player of the weekend'. He scored his 6th and 7th goals of the season when he scored a brace in a 0–4 win against Bristol Rovers on 8 December.

On 1 January 2019, Wilks signed a new 2-year contract extension at Leeds, before extending his loan deal at Doncaster for the remainder of the 2018–19 season.

On 6 January 2019, Wilks scored his 9th goal of the season in Doncaster's 3–1 shock win against EFL Championship side Preston North End. Wilks bagged his 12th of the season, and 10th goal in the league in an impressive performance for Doncaster on 23 February in the local derby game against Scunthorpe. On 5 May 2019 at the club's annual award ceremony, Wilks received the Doncaster Rovers Social Media Player of The Year Award, after accumulating the most man of the match performances during the course of the season.

Wilks helped Doncaster reach the League One playoffs where they were knocked out over two legs by Charlton Athletic in May 2019, with Wilks making a huge impression over the course of the season, he scored 16 goals in all competitions and gained 12 assists.

Barnsley
On 5 July 2019, Wilks joined EFL Championship club Barnsley for an undisclosed fee.

Wilks scored his first goal for the Tykes in a 3–1 defeat to Luton.

Hull City
Wilks signed on a six-month loan for fellow Championship side Hull City on 17 January 2020. He made his debut on 18 January 2020, when he came off the bench as a 71st-minute substitute for Josh Magennis in the 1–0 defeat away to Derby County. Wilks scored his first goal for Hull in a 1–1 draw away to Reading on 8 February 2020.

On 2 July 2020, Hull announced Wilks' loan deal had ended, but shortly after that they confirmed the signing of Wilks on a permanent deal.

On 18 May 2022, Hull City exercised an option for an additional year on his contract.

Sheffield Wednesday
On 22 August 2022, Wilks joined Sheffield Wednesday for an undisclosed fee. He made his debut at home to Forest Green Rovers on 27 August 2022, coming off the bench in a 5-0 win. He scored his first goal for the Owls against Burton Albion on 20 September 2022.

Personal life
Just three days before making his Leeds United debut, Wilks' brother Raheem had been killed outside a barber's shop in Leeds. Despite the tragedy, Wilks played in the FA Cup match against Sutton United. Three people were convicted of Raheem's murder in November 2017.

Style of Play
Wilks is a versatile forward whose main position was to play as a lone striker. During his time on loan at Doncaster Rovers, he has been converted into an attacking winger and plays on either wing. He is known for his pace and his physicality. His manager Grant McCann also described Wilks' style as flamboyant for his showboating skills.

Honours
Accrington Stanley
EFL League Two: 2017–18

Hull City
EFL League One: 2020–21

Individual
PFA Team of the Year: 2020–21 League One

Career statistics

References

External links

1998 births
Living people
Footballers from Leeds
English footballers
Association football forwards
Leeds United F.C. players
Accrington Stanley F.C. players
Grimsby Town F.C. players
Doncaster Rovers F.C. players
Barnsley F.C. players
Hull City A.F.C. players
Sheffield Wednesday F.C. players
English Football League players
Black British sportspeople